
Village Zendo is a combined Soto and Rinzai Zen practice center in lower Manhattan.  Originally located in the apartment of Enkyo Pat O'Hara, who founded the zendo in 1986, the Zen center took up the majority of space in O'Hara's apartment.  Village Zendo is a practice center of the White Plum Asanga and  Zen Peacemaker Circle, the former founded by O'Hara's teacher Taizan Maezumi and the latter by Bernard Glassman.

Mission Statement

To provide a way for realizing a life of awareness, wisdom and compassion. Village Zendo does this by offering training in the teachings of Zen Buddhism and by cultivating and maintaining a practice environment that is supported by teachers and a community of practitioners in the heart of New York City.

See also
Buddhism in the United States
Timeline of Zen Buddhism in the United States

References

External links
 
 Calendar of events
 Daily Meditation Schedule

1986 establishments in New York City
Broadway (Manhattan)
Buddhist temples in New York City
SoHo, Manhattan
White Plum Asanga
Zen centers in New York (state)